Callulops fuscus is a species of frog in the family Microhylidae.
It is endemic to Indonesia.
Its natural habitats are subtropical or tropical moist lowland forests and subtropical or tropical swamps.
It is threatened by habitat loss.

References

Sources

Fuscus
Taxonomy articles created by Polbot
Amphibians described in 1867
Taxa named by Wilhelm Peters